"I Don't Wanna Wait" is a 1996 song by Hanaumi.

It may also refer to:

"I Don't Wanna Wait", a song by SOJA from the 2009 album Born in Babylon
"I Don't Wanna Wait", a 2016 single by Partybaby
"Don't Wanna Wait", a song by Sugababes from the 2000 album One Touch
"Don't Wanna Wait", a song by Count Basic from the 2000 album Trust Your Instincts
"Permanently Scarred (I Don't Wanna Wait)", a song by Tragedy Khadafi from the 2001 album Against All Odds

See also
"I Don't Want to Wait", a 1997 single by Paula Cole